The War to End All Wars is the tenth studio album by Swedish heavy metal band Sabaton, released on 4 March 2022.

The album serves as a sequel to the band's 2019 album The Great War, and is a concept album which, like its predecessor, focuses on the atrocities, miracles and happenings around World War I, such as those of the Christmas truce, the stormtroopers of the German Army, the Race to the Sea, the Treaty of Versailles, the predominant dreadnought type of battleship during the early 20th century, and others.

The single "Christmas Truce" was nominated for Music Video of the Year at the 2021 Global Metal Apocalypse Awards, finishing second overall.

Reception
In the U.S., the album sold 8,000 copies in its first week of release.

Accolades

Track listing

Notes 
 "Sarajevo" is only available on the physical version and digital versions of the History Edition of the album.

Personnel 
Band members
 Joakim Brodén – lead vocals, keyboards
 Pär Sundström – bass, backing vocals
 Chris Rörland – guitars, backing vocals
 Tommy Johannson – guitars, backing vocals
 Hannes Van Dahl – drums, backing vocals
Guest musicians
 Bethan Dixon Bate – narration on "Sarajevo", "Versailles" and History Edition
 Flowing Chords – backing vocals on "Christmas Truce"

Charts

Weekly charts

Year-end charts

References

2022 albums
Sabaton (band) albums
Sequel albums
Concept albums
Nuclear Blast albums